Đakonović (also transliterated Djakonović) is a Serbo-Croatian surname, derived from the word đakon meaning "deacon". It may refer to:

 Luka Đakonović, Yugoslav mayor of Ulcinj
 Vasilije Đakonović, Yugoslav mayor of Ulcinj
 Nikola Đakonović, historian
 Nikola Đakonović, Yugoslav minister of finance
 Dragan Đakonović, musician

Serbian surnames
Montenegrin surnames
Occupational surnames